Psamtik II (Ancient Egyptian: , pronounced ), known by the Graeco-Romans as Psammetichus or Psammeticus, was a king of the Saite-based Twenty-sixth Dynasty of Egypt (595 BC – 589 BC). His prenomen, Nefer-Ib-Re, means "Beautiful [is the] Heart [of] Re." He was the son of Necho II.

Campaigns and battles
Psamtik II led a foray into Nubia in 592 BC, marching as far south as the Third or even the Fourth Cataract of the Nile, according to a contemporary stela from Thebes (Karnak), which dates to Year 3 of this king's name and refers to a heavy defeat that was inflicted upon the kingdom of Kush. A well-known graffito inscribed in Greek on the left leg of the colossal seated statue of Ramesses II, on the south side of the entrance to the temple of Abu Simbel, records that:

 Kerkis was located near the Fifth Cataract of the Nile "which stood well within the Cushite Kingdom."

This was the first confrontation between Egypt and Nubia since the reign of Tantamani. A Kushite king named Anlamani had revived the power of the kingdom of Napata. Psamtik II's campaign was likely initiated to destroy any future aspirations the Kushites may have had to reconquer Egypt. The Egyptian army advanced to Pnubs (Kerma) and the capital city of Napata in a series of fierce battles, where they looted its temples and destroyed the royal Kushite statues.  The Kushite capital was sacked under the reign of the native Kushite king Aspelta who was the younger brother of Anlamani and the son of Senkamanisken. The Year 3 Karnak stela is dated to II Shemu day 10 of Psamtik II's reign and states that:

As a result of Psamtik's devastating campaign, Kush's power was crushed, and its kings from Aspelta onwards lost any opportunity of ever regaining control of Egypt. Instead, the Nubian rulers decided to shift their capital further south from Napata to the relative safety of Meroë. Curiously, however, Psamtik II does not appear to have capitalized on his victory. His troops retreated back to the First Cataract, and Elephantine continued to be the southern border of Egypt.

An outcome of this campaign was the deliberate destruction of monuments belonging to the 25th Dynasty Kushite kings in Egypt "by hacking out their names and the emblems of royalty from their statues and reliefs." Later, in 591 BC, during the fourth year of his reign, Psamtik II launched an expedition into Palestine "to foment a general Levantine revolt against the Babylonians" that involved, among others, Zedekiah of the Kingdom of Judah. Or according to Dan’el Kahn, "592 B.C. seems to be the date of the military reconquest of the Levant by Psammetichus II."

Monuments
Psamtik II was both a dynamic warrior pharaoh as well as a prolific builder in his brief 6-year reign. A significant Saite temple was likely built by Psamtik II and his son Apries at the village of El-Mahalla El-Kubra which lies equidistant from Sebennytos and Behbeit El-Hagar in the Lower Nile Delta. Officials from the Napoleonic expedition to Egypt observed "an extraordinary number of pharaonic building elements of granite and turquoise reused in modern buildings" at this site; this discovery was subsequently confirmed by Nestor L'Hôte in 1828 who counted more than 120 granite columns built into this village's mosque alone. A 1.8 metre long fragment of red granite with the name of Psamtik II and a door lintel of Apries was also seen at El-Mahalla El-Kubra.

Under Psamtik II's reign, a pair of obelisks more than 21.79 metres high were erected in the temple of Heliopolis; the first Emperor of Rome, Augustus, later had one of the obelisks, today known as the Obelisk of Montecitorio, which had probably been thrown down by the Persian invaders in 525 BC, brought to Rome in 10 BC.
Psamtik II also constructed a kiosk on Philae island. This kiosk today "represents the oldest known monument known on the island" and consisted "of a double row of four columns, which were connected by screen walls."

Psamtik II was also responsible for founding the Temple-house at Hibis in El-Kharga Oasis for the triad of Amun, Mut, and Khonsu with significant installations for the cult of Osiris. This 19.5 x 26 metre temple was originally situated on the bank of an ancient lake which has now disappeared and its temple decorations were only completed under the Persian kings Darius I and possibly Darius II. The Hibis temple consisted of a hypostyle hall with two-by-two papyrus capital columns, a hall of offerings, three sanctuaries in the rear section of the temple and a chapel at the side of the sanctuaries for the cult of Psamtik II. The front of the temple house of Hibis featured:
 "a pronaos with four papyrus bundle columns and screen walls. During the construction of the pronaos, the side walls were extended for the addition of a court[yard]. This extension, was, however, only carried out in the 30th Dynasty [by Nectanebo I and Nectanebo II.] The eight papyrus columns of the pronaos still show the New Kingdom type of open, bell-shaped capitals."
A massive sandstone gateway through an outer enclosure wall still stands almost 5 metres tall and was constructed during the Ptolemaic or Roman periods. Many inscriptions and decrees were carved on the gateway on a wide variety of topics such as taxation, inheritance, the court system and the rights of women, with the earliest text dating to 49 AD.

The Temple of Psamtik II at Hibis was completely preserved until 1832 when its roof and portions of the temple were removed for the construction of an aluminium factory. Only excavation work by the Metropolitan Museum of Art in 1910-1911 and restorations performed by the Egyptian Antiquities Service arrested its decline. Today, the Hibis temple remains—together with the Oracle or Ammoneion of Siwa—as "the best preserved and best-documented temple of the early Egyptian Late Period and is therefore a primary monument to the history of [Egyptian temple] building."

Successor

When Psamtik II died in 589 BC, he was succeeded by Apries who was his son by Queen Takhut, a Princess of Athribis. Psamtik and Queen Takhut were also the parents of Menekhubaste, a Priestess of Atum at Heliopolis, and Ankhnesneferibre, a God's Wife of Amun who served in this powerful office in Upper Egypt to the end of the Saite period in 525 BC, when Egypt was conquered by the Persians. The date of Psamtik II's death is mentioned in the Adoption stela of Ankhnesneferibre: Year 7, I Akhet day 23.

References

589 BC deaths
6th-century BC Pharaohs
Pharaohs of the Twenty-sixth Dynasty of Egypt
Year of birth unknown